Coast Guard Alaska is an American reality documentary television series on The Weather Channel that premiered on November 9, 2011. The series follows members of the United States Coast Guard stationed in Kodiak, Alaska on the job.

After a seven episode first season, the series was renewed for a split second season, of five and eight episodes premiering in April and October 2012 respectively. The first season saw ratings increase for The Weather Channel of 95% on the same timeslot the year prior. A third season premiered on July 17, 2013, again made up of a split season of seven then six episodes. A fourth and final eight episode season premiered on February 23, 2015.

A 13 episode spin-off titled Coast Guard Florida premiered in October 2012. This was followed on December 5, 2012 with an hour-long special, Coast Guard: HMS Bounty Rescue, detailing the Coast Guard's attempt to rescue the replica of HMS Bounty and its crew during Hurricane Sandy. Another 13 episode spin-off series, Coast Guard Cape Disappointment/Pacific Northwest, premiered in February 2014.

Episodes

Season 1 (2011—2012)

Season 2 (2012—2013)

Season 3 (2013)

Season 4 (2015)

Streaming releases
The series is streaming on Amazon Prime Video.

References

External links 

 
 

The Weather Channel original programming
English-language television shows
2011 American television series debuts
2015 American television series endings
Television shows about the United States Coast Guard
Television shows set in Alaska
2010s American reality television series
2010s American documentary television series